Eupithecia biornata is a moth in the  family Geometridae. It is found in Romania, Bulgaria, Greece, Ukraine and Russia, east to the Near East and the eastern Palearctic realm.

The wingspan is about 23 mm.

References

Moths described in 1867
biornata
Moths of Europe
Moths of Asia